Maycon Vieira de Freitas or simply Maycon (born February 14, 1985 in Vitória), is a Brazilian footballer who plays for Feirense as a defensive midfielder.

He was called to the preliminary squad of the Brazil under-23 team for the 2008 Summer Olympics; however, he missed out on a place in the final list by coach Dunga.

External links
 

1985 births
Living people
Brazilian footballers
Association football midfielders
Campeonato Brasileiro Série A players
Campeonato Brasileiro Série B players
Sport Club Internacional players
Guarani FC players
Paraná Clube players
Vila Nova Futebol Clube players
Associação Portuguesa de Desportos players
Sampaio Corrêa Futebol Clube players